Burtholme is a civil parish in the Borough of Allerdale in Cumbria, England.  It contains eleven listed buildings that are recorded in the National Heritage List for England.  Of these, six are listed at Grade I, the highest of the three grades, and the others are at Grade II, the lowest grade.  The parish includes the villages of Lanercost and Banks, and is otherwise rural.  Historically, the most important building in the parish was Lanercost Priory.  Following the Dissolution of the Monasteries, parts of the priory buildings have been converted for other uses, and these comprise five of the listed buildings in the parish.  The other listed buildings include a medieval cross base, houses, farmhouses, and farm buildings.


Key

Buildings

References

Citations

Sources

Lists of listed buildings in Cumbria